Fred Montague (1864 – 3 July 1919) was an English film actor of the silent era. He appeared in more than 50 films between 1912 and 1919. He was born in London and died in Los Angeles, California.

Selected filmography

References

External links

1864 births
1919 deaths
English male film actors
English male silent film actors
British expatriate male actors in the United States
Male actors from London
20th-century English male actors